ST Gunundaal was an auxiliary minesweeper operated by the Royal Australian Navy (RAN). Gunundaal was operated commercially as a fishing boat until she was acquired on 8 October 1917 for minesweeping duties during World War I. Gunundaal was returned to her owners in February 1918. She was renamed Gilbert San on 22 March 1928.

Fate
Gilbert San was wrecked on a reef near Cape Howe on 4 November 1929 and declared a total loss.

References 

1914 ships
Ships built on the River Tees
Minesweepers of the Royal Australian Navy
Maritime incidents in 1929
Shipwrecks of Victoria (Australia)
Fishing ships of Australia